Alain "James" Bédé (born 20 August 1970) is a former Ivorian footballer.

Club career
Bédé played for Sporting Toulon during the 1987–88 season.

International career
Bédé was a member of the Ivory Coast national football team during the 1992 King Fahd Cup.

Personal life
Bédé is the father of gridiron football player Boris Bede. Alain also runs his own football academy, James Bede Soccer Academy (JBSA), in Framingham, Massachusetts. JBSA was established in 1998 as Soccer Skill International before changing to its current name in 2002.

References

1970 births
Living people
Ivorian footballers
Ivorian expatriate footballers
Expatriate footballers in France
SC Toulon players
Ivory Coast international footballers
1992 King Fahd Cup players
Association football defenders